Herbert Andrew Baker (9 June 1879 – 5 July 1952) was an Australian rules footballer who played with St Kilda in the Victorian Football League (VFL).

Notes

External links 

1879 births
1952 deaths
Australian rules footballers from Melbourne
St Kilda Football Club players
People from St Kilda, Victoria